Losie is an extinct town in Calhoun County, in the U.S. state of West Virginia.

History
A post office called Losie was established in 1904, and remained in operation until 1951. The community was named after Losie Smith, the wife of an early settler.

References

Ghost towns in West Virginia
Unincorporated communities in Calhoun County, West Virginia
Unincorporated communities in West Virginia